There are more than 50 current and former places of worship in the borough of Havant in Hampshire, England.  Various Christian denominations own and use 42 churches, chapels and meeting halls across the borough, and there is also a meeting place for Hindus; and 10 other buildings no longer function as places of worship but survive in alternative uses.  Havant is one of 13 local government districts in the county of Hampshire—a large county in central southern England, with a densely populated coastal fringe facing the English Channel and a more rural hinterland.  The borough of Havant occupies the southeastern corner of Hampshire and is mostly urban.  The towns of Havant, Emsworth and Waterlooville merge into each other, incorporating older villages such as Bedhampton and Warblington and forming a "long sprawl of inter- and postwar development [along] the London road out of Portsmouth".  Hayling Island is mostly rural but has some 20th-century suburban development.  Some ancient Church of England parish churches survive in the old villages, supplemented by others of the Victorian era and later; alongside these, there is a range of churches and chapels for other denominations, mostly built in the 20th and 21st centuries.

The 2011 United Kingdom census reported that the majority of residents are Christian.  The largest number of churches in Havant belong to the Church of England—the country's Established Church.  Roman Catholicism and the main strands of Protestant Nonconformism—Methodism, Baptists and the United Reformed Church—are also well represented with churches of their own.  Several smaller religious groups also have their own places of worship, including Spiritualists, Jehovah's Witnesses and Plymouth Brethren.

Historic England has awarded listed status to seven current and two former places of worship in Havant borough.  Buildings of "special architectural or historic interest" are placed on a statutory list  by Historic England, a Government body.  Buildings of Grade I status (held by two churches in the borough) are defined as being of "exceptional interest"; two other churches are listed at Grade II*, used for "particularly important buildings of more than special interest"; and Grade II, a status held by three active and two former churches, is used for buildings of "special interest".

Overview of the borough and its places of worship

The first Christian churches in the area were founded during the Saxon era.  One was on Hayling Island, but it was destroyed by flooding and erosion in the Middle Ages and its site is unknown.  The tower of St Thomas à Becket Church at Warblington is partly Anglo-Saxon.  In Havant town, no church was recorded in the Domesday Book but by the late 12th century there was "a sizeable ... church with a central tower", of which some structural evidence remains.  St Peter's Church and St Mary's Church on Hayling Island date from the late 12th or early 13th century and the mid-13th century respectively; at that time most of the island was owned by Jumièges Abbey in Normandy.  Also of ancient origin is St Thomas's Church at Bedhampton, where the chancel arch dates from about 1140.

The next period of churchbuilding came during the Victorian era, by which time the Church of England (Anglican church) was England's established church.  Emsworth, the main settlement in Warblington parish, became a separate parish in the 1840s when St James's Church was built (replacing a small chapel of ease on the town square).  Population growth in the large parish of Farlington, which in the 19th century covered the villages of Waterlooville and Purbrook, prompted the construction of St George's Church (1830) and St John the Baptist (1843) respectively in those places.  Meanwhile, the ancient parish churches were subject to various degrees of restoration at this time.  E.A. Gruning extended and transformed the appearance of Bedhampton church in 1869 and 1878; George Edmund Street and Arthur Blomfield's three rounds of alterations at St Mary's on Hayling Island were "fairly thorough but conservative"; architect Francis Bacon undertook a modest programme of work at St Peter's Church on the island in the 1880s; and St Faith's in Havant was largely rebuilt.  In contrast, Warblington's parish church saw little alteration: the main 19th-century addition was a pair of grave-watchers' huts in the churchyard, prompted by the prevalence of body snatching at that time.  Two mission chapels associated with St Faith were also founded during this era. Langstone Mission Church, now dedicated to St Nicholas, was built by a churchwarden at St Faith's: it was attached to his house, Langstone Towers, but has always been available for public worship.  The Brockhampton Mission Church, a tin tabernacle, was erected in 1874 and served that part of Havant for about a century until it was demolished.

In the 20th century, the rapid growth of population as the area became heavily urbanised resulted in the construction of more Anglican churches.  St Wilfrid's Church opened in 1924 to serve Cowplain, which was then an outlying part of the parish of Catherington; the Eastoke area of Hayling Island had its own church from 1964, when St Andrew's opened; and churches were built in 1962, 1967 and 1970 to serve the central, West Leigh and Warren Park areas respectively of the vast Leigh Park council estate.  Also in 1970, St George's Church at Waterlooville was rebuilt in larger form  to replace its 140-year-old predecessor.

Havant was "one of five ancient centres of Catholicism in Hampshire, with an unbroken history" during the centuries when penal law applied.  Accordingly, it was "the centre of Catholic worship for a large area" in the era before emancipation.  Many members of the local landed gentry were Catholics, and proximity to the English Channel meant that visiting priests from Europe could easily come to serve worshippers and then escape quickly if necessary.  A Catholic mission with a permanent priest was founded in about 1711 at Langstone, and in 1752 a permanent chapel was built in Brockhampton.  This was hidden behind "a very substantially built house" and included a space for the priest to hide.  For many years the chapel served worshippers across a large area covering Chichester, Fareham, Portsmouth and Gosport.  St Joseph's Church on West Street replaced it in 1875, and after World War II chapels of ease (later parish churches in their own right) were founded at Emsworth and Leigh Park.  Emsworth's church opened in 1959 after several years in which Mass was celebrated in a hall.  After Emsworth became a separate parish, its priest began to hold services in private houses and a Nissen hut on the Leigh Park estate, then in 1955 a small church (now the church hall) was built in the middle of the estate.  He also bought land for a second church to serve the eastern part of Leigh Park and Rowland's Castle, but nothing came of this.  On Hayling Island, land for a Catholic church was bought in 1914 and a building opened in July of that year, but the present St Patrick's Church did not open until 1925.  In Waterlooville, a convent was founded in 1889 for the Sisters of Our Lady of Charity, and a chapel was added in 1923.  The Bishop of Portsmouth William Cotter asked the architect W.C. Mangan to make it suitable for public worship as well, so he designed "an extraordinary echelon plan of three naves"—one for parishioners and the other two to be used by the convent.  This was replaced by a larger church in 2010–11.

Primitive Methodists were active in the area in the 1870s, founding chapels at Bedhampton (1875), Emsworth (1876) and Purbrook (1879).  Followers of Wesleyan Methodism opened a chapel of their own in Havant in 1888.  A new chapel at Purbrook opened in 1932, just before the Methodist Union brought the two groups together.  A replacement chapel was built at Emsworth by 1939; then in 1956 a new Methodist church was built on the developing Leigh Park estate, and in 1958 replacement churches were built in both Bedhampton and Havant town.  The late-1960s church building at Hart Plain is also used by Methodists jointly with the Church of England.  The Methodist churches at Leigh Park and Purbrook closed in the early 21st century.

Postwar Baptist churches are found in Leigh Park (1960), Waterlooville (1967), Hayling Island (2012) and Emsworth (2015), but two have much older origins.  Baptist worship in Emsworth dates back to 1848, and the chapel which replaced the original building still stands alongside its much larger 21st-century replacement—a combined church and community facility.  Waterlooville's complex of Baptist chapel, Sunday school building and institute disappeared during the wholesale redevelopment of the town centre in the 1960s; its replacement, north of town on the London Road, has been praised for its "simple, elegant [and] finely proportioned" form.

Congregationalism in the Havant area has a 300-year history: a meeting was founded in Havant in 1719, and nine years later a chapel was built on The Pallant.  Architecturally distinctive, it has been called "the only notable Nonconformist building surviving" in the Portsmouth and south Hampshire area from the pre-Victorian era, although it is no longer in religious use: it was superseded by the present Havant United Reformed Church in 1891.  Since May 2019 this has been part of a joint congregation with Emsworth United Reformed Church, whose origins lie in a mid-19th-century chapel.  Congregational chapels opened in South Hayling (1830; replaced in 1954 after war damage) and North Hayling (1874) in the 19th century; both were in use until 1991, when the North Hayling church closed.

Various other Christian groups are represented throughout the borough.  Churches of an Evangelical character are found on the Leigh Park and Wecock Farm estates; at Cowplain, where an Evangelical mission hall was founded in the early 20th century; and in a shopping centre in Havant town centre.  A Pentecostal church on Hayling Island occupies the former Elm Grove Free Church, registered as an "unsectarian Gospel mission hall" in 1897.  Spiritualists, Jehovah's Witnesses and the Plymouth Brethren Christian Church are also represented.  A Hindu group also has premises in Havant town.

Large parts of the borough's land were used by Portsmouth City Council to house people displaced from homes destroyed by bombing in World War II—the Leigh Park and Wecock Farm estates were both developed for this purpose—and several churches have Portsmouth connections.  The postwar Methodist churches at Bedhampton and Leigh Park were funded by War Damage Commission compensation payments in respect of the destruction of two Methodist churches in Portsmouth, at Arundel Street and Stamford Street respectively.  Trustees of the former Bible Christian chapel at Albert Road donated money to the new Havant Methodist Church in 1958, while Purbrook Methodist Church received £4,000 from the sale of a chapel in Powerscourt Road, North End, and was given the organ from Brougham Road church in Southsea.  The foundation stone from the bombed Lake Road Baptist Chapel in Portsmouth (the largest in Southern England, with a capacity of 1,800) was retrieved and built into the wall at Leigh Park Baptist Church.

Religious affiliation
According to the 2011 United Kingdom census, 120,684 lived in the borough of Havant.  Of these, 59.22% identified themselves as Christian, 0.47% were Muslim, 0.22% were Buddhist, 0.19% were Hindu, 0.07% were Jewish, 0.05% were Sikh, 0.47% followed another religion, 32.25% claimed no religious affiliation and 7.05% did not state their religion.  The proportion of people in the borough who followed no religion was higher than the figure in England as a whole (24.74%); adherence to Christianity was similar (in 2011 59.38% of people were Christian); and Islam, Judaism, Hinduism, Sikhism and Buddhism all had a lower following than in the country overall (at census date 5.02% of people were Muslim, 1.52% were Hindu, 0.79% were Sikh, 0.49% were Jewish and 0.45% were Buddhist).

Administration

Anglican churches
All Anglican churches in the borough are part of the Anglican Diocese of Portsmouth, which is based at Portsmouth Cathedral.  The diocese has seven deaneries plus the cathedral's own separate deanery.  The Havant Deanery is responsible for all the borough's parish churches: at Bedhampton (St Nicholas and St Thomas), Cowplain (St Wilfrid and Hart Plain Church), Emsworth, Havant town, Hayling Island (St Andrew, St Mary and St Peter), Langstone, Leigh Park (St Alban, St Clare and St Francis), Purbrook (the Good Shepherd and St John the Baptist), Warblington and Waterlooville.

Roman Catholic churches
The Catholic churches at Emsworth, Havant town, Hayling Island, Leigh Park and Waterlooville are within Deanery 5 and the Havant Pastoral Area of the Roman Catholic Diocese of Portsmouth, whose seat is the Cathedral of St John the Evangelist in Portsmouth.  St Joseph's Church in Havant town and the Church of St Thomas of Canterbury and St Thomas More at Emsworth are in the parish of Havant; this extends to the West Sussex and Portsmouth city boundaries and also covers Bedhampton and Langstone.  The parish of Hayling Island is represented by St Patrick's Church and covers the whole island.  The parish of St Michael and All Angels Church at Leigh Park covers all parts of the Leigh Park estate and extends to Rowland's Castle in the neighbouring district of East Hampshire.  Waterlooville's parish church of the Sacred Heart and St Peter is now the only church in the large parish of Waterlooville, which extends to Purbrook, Widley and Cowplain in Havant borough and the southeast corner of Winchester district (Denmead, Hambledon and surrounding areas).  The Diocese opened two chapels of ease in the parish in Purbrook and Cowplain in the 1970s, but both were closed in the 1990s.

Other denominations
The borough's four Methodist churches—at Bedhampton, Emsworth, Hart Plain and Havant—are part of the 23-church East Solent and Downs Methodist Circuit.  Emsworth, Hayling Island, Leigh Park and Waterlooville Baptist Churches belong to the Southern Counties Baptist Association.  Bethel Evangelical Free Church in Leigh Park is part of three Evangelical groups: GraceNet UK, an association of Reformed Evangelical Christian churches and organisations; the Fellowship of Independent Evangelical Churches (FIEC), a pastoral and administrative network of about 500 churches with an evangelical outlook; and Affinity (formerly the British Evangelical Council), a network of conservative Evangelical congregations throughout Great Britain.  Cowplain Evangelical Church is also a member of FIEC.  Havant Spiritualist Church belongs to the Spiritualists' National Union and is within the organisation's Southern District, which covers Hampshire, the Isle of Wight, Dorset and Wiltshire.

Listed status

Two churches in the borough are Grade I-listed, two have Grade II* status and five (including two former churches) are listed at Grade II.  As of February 2001, there were 239 listed buildings in the borough of Havant: 2 with Grade I status, 5 listed at Grade II* and 232 with Grade II status.  In England, a building or structure is defined as "listed" when it is placed on a statutory register of buildings of "special architectural or historic interest" by the Secretary of State for Digital, Culture, Media and Sport, a Government department, in accordance with the Planning (Listed Buildings and Conservation Areas) Act 1990.  Historic England, a non-departmental public body, acts as an agency of this department to administer the process and advise the department on relevant issues.

Historic England also publishes an annual "Heritage at Risk Register"—a survey of assets at risk through decay, damage and similar issues.  In the latest update, St Faith's Church in Havant town was identified as being at risk because of the deteriorating condition of the roof.

Current places of worship

Former places of worship

Notes

References

Bibliography

 (Available online in 14 parts; Guide to abbreviations on page 6)

Havant
Havant
Havant
Havant, Places of worship
Places of worship